The A98 road is a major coastal road of northeast Scotland passing through Moray and Aberdeenshire. The A98 is no longer a primary route, with this status being removed shortly after the A92 was renumbered A90.

Route 

It originates in the west at Fochabers at a junction with the A96, and proceeds northeast, passing close to Buckie, Findochty and Portknockie before passing through Cullen and Portsoy.

After a junction with the A95 it passes through Banff and Macduff. It then bears southeast and inland for some distance, passing near to the prehistoric monument of Longman Hill; thence it runs close to New Pitsligo before heading northeast to Fraserburgh where it terminates.

References

External links

Roads in Scotland
Transport in Aberdeenshire
Transport in Moray